La tumultueuse vie d’un déflaté is a 2009 documentary film.

Synopsis 
The film portrays the turbulent life of the "Great Z", an engine driver on the Abidjan - Ouagadougou line for twenty years. He was laid off in 1995 by the National Railways of Burkina Faso following the privatization imposed by the World Bank. A seasoned reveler and a hedonist to the bone, he suddenly finds himself with no reason to live. He has lost everything and lives a gloomy life while waiting for his retirement pension. Tormented and employing a brutal and violent vocabulary, he emphatically describes his problems, his hatreds and his hopes.

Festivals 
The film was the closing film for the 2010 Festival International du Film des Droits de l’Homme in Paris.

Awards 
 Corsica Doc Prize for Best Film, Festival international du film documentaire d'Ajaccio
 Festival Internacional de Documentales de Ajaccio 2009
 Festival Quintessence (Ouidah, Benín) 2010

References 

2009 films
2009 documentary films
French documentary films
Rail transport in Burkina Faso
Documentary films about rail transport
2000s French-language films
2000s French films